Somali Airlines Flight 40 was a scheduled domestic Somali Airlines flight on 20 July 1981 from Mogadishu to Hargeisa in Somalia. The aircraft crashed a few minutes after takeoff, and all 44 passengers and six crew on board were killed.

Flight
On 20 July 1981, Somali Airlines Flight 40, operated by a Fokker F27 Friendship, took off from Mogadishu's Mogadishu International Airport en route to Hargeisa International Airport in Hargeisa. It later returned to the Mogadishu airport for some repairs, before departing a second time. A few minutes after Flight 40 took off again, the aircraft entered an area of heavy rainfall. The flight crew subsequently lost control and crashed near the town of Balad. All 50 people on board were killed, the most fatalities in a single aircraft crash within Somali airspace.

Investigation
The crash investigation determined that the aircraft had entered a spiral dive after encountering strong vertical gusts. Loads during the dive increased to approximately 5.76 g, exceeding the design stress limits of the Fokker F27 type and causing its right wing to separate. The flight crew were believed to have erred in taking off during known thunderstorm conditions.

References

Accidents and incidents involving the Fokker F27
Aviation accidents and incidents in 1981
Aviation accidents and incidents in Somalia
Airliner accidents and incidents caused by pilot error
Airliner accidents and incidents caused by weather
1981 in Somalia
1981 meteorology
July 1981 events in Africa
1981 disasters in Somalia